Hiko can refer to
 Hiko, Nevada
 the male or gender neutral version of Hime
 juggling in Tongan dance, see Ula (dance)